Cash Cab is a Canadian game show produced by Castlewood Productions that began airing on September 10, 2008 on Discovery Channel and Discovery HD. It is hosted by comedian Adam Growe. The game show airs in Canada instead of the American version of the series, which airs on the affiliated US Discovery Channel network. Cash Cab is the English version of the Cash Cab franchise available in Canada; the French version is called Taxi Payant, and airs on V.

Game show
The game show features rounds like "Shout Outs", "Red Light Challenges", and the "Double or Nothing" Video Bonus option at the end of each game. However, the Canadian version differs in its heavier focus on questions of science, technology, nature and adventure, as opposed to purely general knowledge. Regular questions are worth $25, $50, $100; while Red Light Challenge questions are worth $75. In the second season, a third "lifeline" was added: when contestants reach the $100 questions, they have the option to "swap out" a question, and the Cash Cab dispatcher will give them a new question.

In the Cash Cab Vancouver season, a bridge bonus was added, which doubles the score for the current question once per session. After returning to Toronto, a high five bonus was added, which doubles the score for the fifth correct answer in a row.

The 8th season and last season of Cash Cab aired in 2015, which features a new "Triple Play" component, where contestants have a chance to triple their winnings if they go for the Video Bonus Question, and only if they arrive at their destination strike-free.

Over 200 episodes have been completed, plus a one-hour special.  All episodes of Cash Cab were shot in Canadian cities, with all but 1 season of 26 episodes filmed in downtown Toronto.  Season 5 was shot in Vancouver in the summer of 2011. 
The cab used is a Toyota Sienna minivan.

History
Following the success of the first season, Canada's host Adam Growe was invited to host a special season premiere episode of the American Cash Cab on December 23, 2008, which promoted the feature film Frost/Nixon.

In the summer of 2009, Cash Cab was briefly broadcast in a programming block with Qubit.

On July 16, 2011, a 61-year-old man from Surrey, British Columbia was struck and killed in downtown Vancouver by a vehicle used for the Canadian version of Cash Cab. The incident happened while the producer was driving the cab back to the storage facility after filming.

Related shows
A French Canadian version is also aired on V (formerly known as TQS) and is filmed in Montreal. It is known as Taxi Payant (Paying Taxi) and uses a Dodge Grand Caravan. Comedian Alexandre Barrette is the host.

References

External links

Cash Cab
2000s Canadian game shows
2010s Canadian game shows
2008 Canadian television series debuts
2015 Canadian television series endings
Television shows filmed in Toronto
Television shows filmed in Vancouver
Discovery Channel (Canada) original programming